Muḥammad ʾĀmīn ʾAstarābādī (died 1623/24 or 1626/1627) was an Iranian theologian and founder or proponent of the orthodox conservative(Akhbari) strand in Twelver Shia Islamic belief, those who base their theology on hadiths and reject fatwas. He was born in Astarabadi, the former name of Gorgan.
 
Astarabadi saw himself as a reviver of a lost Islamic tradition, known as the sunnah. He was followed by a number of scholars who explicitly identified themselves with the Akhbari. These scholars called for the return to the hadith sources, in a belief that the words and actions of the Imams were readily seen, but had been corrupted by centuries of excessive commentary.

Works
 Fawāʾid al Madaniyyah fī ar Radd ʿalā min qāl bal ʾIjtihād wa at Taqlīd fī al ʾAḥkām al ʾilāhiyya()
 Ḥāshiyyah ʿalā Sharḥ al Madarāk 
 Sharḥ at Tahdhīb
 Sharḥ al ʾIstibsār
 ʾUnmūdhaj al ʿUlūm

See also
 Usuli, the denomination within the Twelver Shia school that Astarabadi opposed

References

 Abisaab, Rula J. (2015) "Shi`i Jurisprudence, Sunnism and the Traditionist Thought (akhbārī) of Muhammad Amin Astarabadi (d. 1036/1626-7), IJMES 47: 5-23.
 Newman, Andrew J. (1992) "The Nature of the Akhbari/Usuli Dispute in Late Safawid Iran, Part 2: The Conflict Reassessed" Bulletin of the School of Oriental and African Studies University of London 55(2): pp. 250–261
 Gleave, Robert (2004) "Akhbariyya" Encyclopedia of Islam and the Muslim World (ed. Richard C. Martin) Vol. 1, Macmillan Reference USA, New York, 
 Gleave, Robert (2007) Scripturalist Islam: the history and doctrines of the Akhbari Shi'i school Brill Academic, Leiden, 

1620s deaths
Hadith scholars
Year of birth unknown
17th-century Muslim theologians
Iranian Shia scholars of Islam
16th-century writers of Safavid Iran
Safavid theologians
17th-century writers of Safavid Iran
People from Gorgan
17th-century Iranian writers